Thomas W. Powers is a Catholic priest of the Diocese of Bridgeport in Connecticut. On March 30, 2022, it was announced that he will succeed Fr. Peter Harman as the twenty-fourth rector of the Pontifical North American College in Rome.

Biography

Early life
Thomas W. Powers was raised in Newtown, Connecticut. The son of Thomas and Margaret Mary Powers, he is one of five children. He attended Immaculate High School in Danbury and went on to undergraduate studies at the University of Notre Dame. He graduated in 1987 with a Bachelor of Arts in economics and a minor in finance. After college, he worked as a financial consultant with Anderson Consulting in New York.

Priesthood
In 1992, Powers entered seminary and completed philosophical studies through St. John Fisher Seminary in Trumbull. He went on to study theology at the Pontifical North American College and obtained a bachelor's degree in Sacred Theology at the Pontifical Gregorian University and a licentiate at the John Paul II Institute when it was part of the Pontifical Lateran University. He was ordained a priest for the Diocese of Bridgeport on May 24, 1997.

After ordination, Powers served as parochial vicar at St. Theresa Parish in Trumbull from 1998 to 2001. From 2001 to 2005, he served as the spiritual director of St. John Fisher Seminary and chaplain of Trinity Catholic High School in Stamford. In 2005, he was sent to Rome to serve in the Vatican's Congregation for Bishops, during which time he served as an adjunct spiritual director for seminarians at the North American College. He was named a Chaplain of His Holiness with the title "Monsignor" in 2010. After returning to Bridgeport in 2015, he served as vicar general and moderator of the curia of the diocese. Since 2020, he has also served as pastor of St. John Parish in Darien.

Rector of the North American College
Powers' appointment as Rector of the Pontifical North American College was made public on March 30, 2022. His term will begin on July 1, 2022.

References

Living people
20th-century American Roman Catholic priests
21st-century American Roman Catholic priests
Pontifical North American College alumni
Pontifical North American College rectors
Roman Catholic Diocese of Bridgeport
University of Notre Dame alumni
Pontifical Gregorian University alumni
Religious leaders from Connecticut
Year of birth missing (living people)